Michelle Couttolenc is a Mexican-American sound engineer. She won an Academy Award in the category Best Sound for the film Sound of Metal.

Selected filmography 
 Sound of Metal (2020; co-won with Nicolas Becker, Jaime Baksht, Carlos Cortés Navarrete and Phillip Bladh)

References

External links 

Living people
Place of birth missing (living people)
Year of birth missing (living people)
American audio engineers
Mexican audio engineers
Best Sound Mixing Academy Award winners
21st-century American engineers
21st-century Mexican engineers
Mexican emigrants to the United States